The Porsche 993 is the internal designation for the Porsche 911 model manufactured and sold between January 1994 and early 1998 (model years 1995–1998 in the United States), replacing the 964. Its discontinuation marked the end of air-cooled 911 models.

The 993 was much improved over and quite different from its predecessor. According to Porsche, every part of the car was designed from the ground up, including the engine and only 20% of its parts were carried over from the previous generation. Porsche refers to the 993 as "a significant advance, not just from a technical, but also a visual perspective." Porsche's engineers devised a new light-alloy subframe with coil and wishbone suspension (an all new multi-link system,  Weissach axle), putting behind the previous lift-off oversteer and making significant progress with the engine and handling, creating a more civilized car overall and providing an improved driving experience. The 993 was also the first 911 to receive a six speed transmission.

The 993 had several variants, as its predecessors, varying in body style, engines, drivetrains, and included equipment. Power was increased by the addition of the VarioRam system, particularly in the midranges, and also resulted in more throttle noise at higher revolutions; as a consequence, it resulted in a 15% increase in power over its predecessor.

The external design of the Porsche 993, penned by English designer Tony Hatter, retained the basic body shell architecture of the 964 and other earlier 911 models, but with revised exterior panels, with much more flared wheel arches, a smoother front and rear bumper design, an enlarged retractable rear wing, and teardrop mirrors.

A 993 GT2 was used as the safety car during the 1995 Formula One season.

Overview

Technical improvements
A major change was the implementation of all alloy multilink rear suspension attached to an alloy subframe, a completely new design derived from the 989, a four-door sedan that never went into production. The system later continued in the 993's successor, the 996, and required the widening of the rear wheel arches, which gave better stability. The new suspension improved handling, making it more direct, more stable, and helping to reduce the tendency to oversteer if the throttle were lifted during hard cornering, a trait of earlier 911s. It also reduced interior noise and improved ride quality.

The 993 was the first generation of the 911 to have a six-speed manual transmission included as standard; its predecessors had four- or five-speed transmissions. In virtually every situation,  keeping the engine at its best torque range above 4,500 rpm was possible. The Carrera, Carrera S, Cabriolet, and Targa models (rear-wheel drive) were available with a "Tiptronic" four-speed automatic transmission, first introduced in the 964. From the 1995 model year, Porsche offered the Tiptronic S with additional steering wheel-mounted controls and refined software for smoother, quicker shifts. Since the 993's introduction, the Tiptronic is capable of recognising climbs and descents. The Tiptronic-equipped cars suffer as compared to the manual transmission equipped cars in both acceleration and also top speed, but the differences are not much notable. Tiptronic cars also suffered a  increase in weight.

The 993's optional all-wheel drive system was refined over that of the 964. Porsche departed from the 964's setup consisting of three differentials and revised the system based on the layout from its 959 flagship, replacing the centre differential with a viscous coupling unit. In conjunction with the 993's redesigned suspension, this system improved handling characteristics in inclement weather and still retained the stability offered by all-wheel drive without having to suffer as many compromises as the previous all-wheel drive system. Its simpler layout also reduced weight, though the four-wheel drive Carrera 4 weighs  more than its rear-wheel drive counterpart (at  vs. ).

Other improvements over the 964 include a new dual-flow exhaust system, larger brakes with drilled discs, and a revised power steering.

Variants

Carrera coupé / cabriolet

The Carrera was available in rear- and all-wheel drive versions. It was equipped with the naturally aspirated 3.6-liter M64 engine, further developed from the 964, and combined with a new dual-flow exhaust system now incorporating two catalytic converters. The 993 Carrera originally was equipped with orange turn indicators on the front, side, and rear, black brake calipers, black Carrera logo on the rear, and 16-inch alloy wheels with black Porsche logos on the center wheelcaps. This model's ground clearance was 110 mm, except for the US version, which had a ground clearance of 120 mm. This was further lowered with the M030 sport chassis option to 90 mm. The coupé is the stiffest, tightest, most solid, yet lightest of the 993 models.

The Cabriolet, introduced simultaneously alongside the coupé in April 1994 for the 1995 model year, featured a fully electrical and hand-stitched soft top reinforced with metal sheets and an automatic wind blocker. On the rear of the Cabriolet, a small spoiler was mounted with the third braking light. A high percentage of the total Cabriolets produced ended up in the US. Both the coupé and convertible variants of the 993 were available with all-wheel drive.

Porsche also offered the 993 Carrera as an all-wheel drive version called the Carrera 4. In contrast with the 964, Porsche deleted the "2" from the rear-wheel drive "Carrera" name tag. Among enthusiasts, though, to differentiate between the rear-wheel and all-wheel drive variants of the Type 993 Carrera, they were (and still are) commonly referred to as "C2" and "C4". The Carrera 4 has an automatic braking differential; it brakes the inner wheel when accelerating out of a corner. On the exterior, the Carrera 4 is visually distinguishable by clear front and side turn indicators and rear red turn indicators. The brake calipers are painted silver, as is the Carrera 4 badge on the engine cover. The center wheel-caps carry the Carrera 4 logo instead of the Porsche crest. Key feature on the 993 Carrera 4 is the weight saving in the all-wheel-drive system as compared to the 964, a lower maintenance viscous coupling unit that transfers 5-50% of power to the front wheels and changes the driving behavior of the car compared to the standard Carrera. The 993 Carrera 4 all-wheel drive is suited to cope with bad weather conditions, which provides extra security in rain or snow, though on a dry circuit, the C2 is the faster car, and the C4 is of course heavier than the C2. There was no Tiptronic option available on the Carrera 4.

The options list for the 993 Carrera (and most other variants) offered many choices, including up to five different styles of wheels, various suspension set-ups, and three different seat styles (comfort, sport, racing). In addition, many upholstery options were offered and various sound systems including digital sound processing. Further, customers had the option of any colour other than standard shades. Even more, the Tequipment and Exclusive-Programs added further options and built to order almost any specific wishes of customers such as special consoles, fax machines, or even brightly coloured interior upholstery.

In contrast with most of the other variants, production of the Carrera coupé and Cabriolet ceased with the end of 1997 model year, except for a very few produced in a shortened 1998 model year.

Targa

The Targa version of the 993 was introduced in the 1996 model year and was the debut of the so-called "greenhouse" system - a retractable glass roof, a design continued on the 996 and 997 Targa. The glass roof retracts underneath the rear window, revealing a large opening. This system was a complete redesign, as previous Targa models had a removable roof section and a wide B-pillar functioning as a roll bar. The new glass-roof design allowed the 993 Targa to retain the same side-on profile as the other 911 Carrera variants and finish without the inconvenience of storing the removed top of the old system. The Targa is based on the 993 Carrera cabriolet with the Targa glass roof replacing the fabric roof.

The Targa was equipped with distinctive two-piece  wheels, which could be ordered as an option on all cars not having standard  wheels. Common problems with the Targa include excessive heat in the cabin, creaking noises on rough roads, and a very complicated and unreliable roof mechanism. In addition, the Targa roof is heavier than the coupé's roof, and that extra weight is at the top of the car, raising its center of gravity and decreasing handling performance.

Targa production numbers:

1996: 2,442 (US+Canada: 462)
1997: 1,843 (US+Canada: 567)
1998:  334 (US+Canada: 122)
Total: 4,619

Turbo

The 993 Turbo coupé was introduced in 1995. Air-to-air intercoolers, electronic engine management, redesigned cylinder heads, and other modified engine internals completed the new engine. The 993 Turbo was the first 911 Turbo with all-wheel drive, taken from the 959 flagship model. The Turbo's bodywork differs from the Carrera by widened rear wheel arches (about 6 cm), redesigned front and rear bumper moldings, and a fixed "whale tail" rear wing housing the intercoolers. New  alloy wheels with hollow spokes were standard.

The 993 Turbo was one of the first production cars in the world to have an OBDII diagnostics system (the 3.8-litre and GT versions did not have that system, and the normally aspirated 993 variants did not receive it until 1996 model year). The successors of the 993 Turbo since have had water-cooled heads. The car also had larger brakes than those on the base Carrera model.

Throughout the production run of the Turbo, two distinct differences existed. The 1997 and 1998 cars had these differences from the 1996 cars:
 Stronger transmission input shafts (a known weakness due to the combination of immense power and AWD system) were used.
 The ECU was able to be flashed and modified (the 1996 model's ECU was not modifiable).
 With the addition of a Porsche child seat, the passenger airbag was cut off.
 Motion sensors for the alarm were integrated into the map light above the rear view mirror.
 Standard wheel center caps  had "turbo" embedded on them (the 1996 version had Porsche crests).

The Porsche 993 Turbo is featured in Need For Speed: High Stakes as the flagship car of the game, as well as in Need for Speed: Porsche Unleashed.

Turbo S

During the second-to-last year of production of the 993 (1997), Porsche offered the 993 Turbo S, which was manufactured by Porsche Exclusiv department. The Turbo S is a high-specification Turbo including a power upgrade to 450 hp (DIN) (424 hp (SAE) for the American market) achieved by larger Triple K K-24 turbochargers, an additional oil cooler, and a modified Motronic engine management system. The inclusion of extras including carbon fibre decoration in the interior makes it different from the earlier lightweight, spartan 964 Turbo S. The 993 Turbo S is recognized by yellow brake calipers, a slightly larger rear wing, a quad-pipe exhaust system, a front spoiler with brake-cooling ducts (on European market cars), carbon fibre door sills with 'Turbo S' badging, and air scoops behind the doors. This was the last of the air-cooled 911 Turbos.

Carrera 4S / Carrera S

The Carrera 4 S (1996) and the later rear-wheel drive Carrera S (1997) shared the Turbo model's bodyshell, but housed the naturally aspirated engine in the rear. Both of the S models had slightly lowered suspension as compared to standard Carrera models. Due to this, the S has a quicker acceleration time and a slightly greater top speed than the 4S. Although a Carrera S Cabriolet was never officially offered by the factory, a small number (believed to be five) were specially ordered through the Porsche Exclusiv department in 1997 and sold as 1998 models by Beverly Hills Porsche in California and only one was ordered by a VIP client through Porsche Exclusiv department for the European market. The wide bodywork is widely acclaimed for its rear looks; it creates more aerodynamic drag, leading to slightly lower top speeds compared to the narrower siblings (about 5 km/h), but the wider tyres result in excellent road holding. The Carrera S is one of the most valuable 993 variants. Production of the Carrera S amounted to 1,752 examples for all of North America during the entire 993 series production run (in part because they were manufactured only for the 1997 model year, together with a very brief stub period later in 1997 denominated as 1998 models), though the special extremely limited run models such as the 993 RS, GT, and Turbo S are rarer and more expensive.

Carrera RS

The Carrera RS is a lightweight variant of the Carrera. It features a naturally aspirated 3.8-liter engine generating a maximum power output of  achieved by the use of lightweight forged pistons, dual oil coolers, big intake valves, Varioram variable-length intake manifold, a modified Bosch Motronic engine management system, and lightened rocker arms. The six-speed G50/31 manual gearbox with a short shifter used on the Carrera RS had modified gear ratios for the first three gears. The larger 322 mm cross drilled and ventilated discs brakes front and aft with four piston calipers were shared with the 911 Turbo and limited-slip differential was included as standard equipment. The exterior is easily distinguishable from a normal Carrera by a large fixed rear wing, small front flaps, and three-piece  aluminum wheels. The headlight washers were deleted for weightsaving reasons. A seam-welded body shell with an aluminum bonnet supported with a single strut was used along with thinner glass. On the interior, the rear seats were removed, and special racing seats along with spartan door cards were installed. Sound proofing was also reduced to a minimum. The suspension system used Bilstein dampers and the ride height was lowered for improved handling. Adjustable front and rear antiroll bars and an under-bonnet strut brace further increased handling.

The Carrera RS Clubsport (also referred to as the RSR or RSCS in some countries) was a track-oriented iteration of the Carrera RS with relatively limited road usability. The Clubsport came equipped with a welded roll cage. Certain comfort features such as carpets, power windows, air conditioning, and radio were deleted. The exterior wise sports a larger rear wing and a deeper chin spoiler than the standard RS.

The Carrera RS was produced in model years 1995 and 1996. It was street legal in European and many other countries around the world, but was not approved for export to the United States. Production amounted to 1,014 cars, including 213 Clubsport variants.

GT2

The GT2 was the racing version of the 993 Turbo made to compete in the FIA GT2 class racing. By the mid-1990s, most of the sanctioning bodies of road racing had placed severe limitations, if not outright bans on the use all-wheel drive systems, due in part to Audi's earlier success in campaigning their various Quattro cars in touring car races around the globe, to Porsche's 959 and its racing version the 961, and in part to the Nissan Skyline. In this atmosphere, to take their turbo-engined 993 racing, Porsche developed the rearwheel drive GT. The deletion of the all-wheel drive also brought with it the benefit of significant weight savings to the competition car. To qualify the car for racing, a few street-legal variants were created for homologation purposes, which are now highly prized and valued by collectors. The interior treatment of the GT2 is similar to that of the sibling Carrera RS. The fenders of the Turbo have been cut back and replaced with bolt-on plastic pieces  to accommodate large racing tyres and to help ease the repairs of damage to the fenders that are an often recurring event in auto racing.

Only 57 road-legal variants were built.

The racing variants have different engine set-ups depending on the applicable racing series.

Additionally, the rear deck lid of the street-legal version of the GT2 also sported "911 GT" instead of "911 GT2".

Speedster

The Speedster model was a variant of the 993, with a lowered roof, and a redesigned interior.

In contrast to the G-model and the 964, Porsche never officially offered the 993 in a Speedster body style. However, two were built by the factory - a dark green Speedster equipped with Tiptronic S and  wheels for Ferdinand Alexander Porsche (for his 60th anniversary) in 1995 and another wide-body, silver Speedster with manual transmission and  wheels for American TV star Jerry Seinfeld in 1998.  The Seinfeld speedster was originally delivered as a cabriolet model and later sent back to the factory Exclusiv department to be "rebuilt" as a speedster. Additionally, a few 993 convertibles were converted to the Speedster body style by aftermarket coach builders.

Turbo Cabriolet

After the 3.3-liter G-model Turbo convertible (1987–89), Porsche never officially offered an air-cooled Turbo convertible again. However, in 1995, a small number (believed to be 14) 993 Turbo Cabriolets were sold before the introduction of the 993 Turbo coupé. They featured the  single-turbo engine of the 964 Turbo 3.6, a five-speed manual transmission, rear-wheel drive and the rear wing of the 964 Turbo 3.6. This cost a premium of DM 89,500 (or plus 62%) over the standard 993 Cabriolet's price.

Performance

Production figures

Media 
The 993 generation of the 911 is often referred to as the best and most desirable of the 911 series, not only because of its beauty, but also because of its great performance, even by modern standards. The 993 is quoted as "the last complete 'modern classic'"; "the 993 was and forever will be that last fresh breath of air that Porsche gave the world; elegance and muscle all in one package." The book "Porsche 993 - Essential Companion" refers to the 993 as the "King of Porsche," and it is generally acknowledged as "The purists' Holy Grail."

In its 12 April 2017 article entitled "The Porsche 993 Actually Lives up to the Hype," Road & Track writes that the 993 is "something truly special," with "a combination of old-school feel and modern usability that isn't found in many other cars," with "great steering, great brakes, and a wonderfully composed package." It also states that "The 993 is also beautifully built -- it's a relic from the time when Porsche didn't cut corners anywhere."

Successor 
The 993 was replaced by the 996. This represented a dramatic change for the 911. As many enthusiasts agree, "the 993 is one of the sweetest spots in the 911's half-century of existence," and while "more modern versions might be more dynamically capable, they're bloated behemoths in comparison to the lean 993."

References

Further reading
Bongers, Marc (2004). Porsche — Serienfahrzeuge und Sportwagen seit 1948 (first edition). Motorbuch Verlag. 
Frère, Paul (2002). Die Porsche 911 Story (revised and last edition). Motorbuch Verlag. 
Streather, Adrian (2005). Porsche 993: The Essential Companion (first edition). Veloce Publishing. 
Porsche, Christophorus, Issue no. 5 (September) of 1993, pages 11 ff. ISSN 0412-3417

External links

 Official website of Porsche
 Official site for 993 owners and fans
 993 Owners and information
 Porsche 911 Carrera 2 (Generation 993) Exterior and Interior in Full HD 3D YouTube

993
Sports cars
All-wheel-drive vehicles
Rear-wheel-drive vehicles
Cars powered by boxer engines
Cars introduced in 1993
Rear-engined vehicles
Coupés